The 2014–15 Seton Hall Pirates women's basketball team represented Seton Hall University during the 2014–15 NCAA Division I women's basketball season. The Pirates, led by second head coach Anthony Bozella, played its home games in Newark, New Jersey at the Walsh Gymnasium and were members of the Big East Conference. They finished the season 28–6, 15–3 in Big East to share the Big East regular season title with DePaul. They advanced to the championship game of the Big East women's tournament where they lost to DePaul. They received an at-large bid of the NCAA women's basketball tournament where they lost to Rutgers in the first round. With 28 wins in the regular season, the most wins in school history.

Roster

Rankings

Schedule

|-
!colspan=9 style="background:#0000FF; color:#D3D3D3;"| Exhibition

|-
!colspan=9 style="background:#0000FF; color:#D3D3D3;"| Regular Season

|-
!colspan=9 style="background:#0000ff; color:#D3D3D3;"| Big East Women's Tournament

|-
!colspan=9 style="background:#0000ff; color:#D3D3D3;"|NCAA Women's Tournament

See also
 2014–15 Seton Hall Pirates men's basketball team

References

Seton Hall
Seton Hall Pirates women's basketball seasons
Seton